The Anderson-Coward House, also known as Justine's Restaurant, is a historic mansion in Memphis, Tennessee, USA.

History
The mansion was built circa 1852 for Nathaniel Anderson, a planter. It was designed in the Italianate architectural style. It was purchased by H.M. Grosvenor, until it was acquired by William C. Coward as debt settlement. It was passed on to his son, William Holliday Coward. After his death in the early 1900s, it was inherited by his daughter Ida and her husband, Robert O. Johnston, a lawyer and banker.

The mansion was repurposed as a restaurant in 1958.

Architectural significance
It has been listed on the National Register of Historic Places since March 13, 1986.

References

Houses on the National Register of Historic Places in Tennessee
Italianate architecture in Tennessee
Houses completed in 1852
Houses in Memphis, Tennessee
National Register of Historic Places in Memphis, Tennessee
1852 establishments in Tennessee